Princess Annemarie of Bourbon-Parma, Duchess of Parma and Piacenza (née  Gualthérie van Weezel; born 18 December 1977) is a Dutch consultant, former journalist, and a member of the House of Bourbon-Parma and the Dutch Royal Family. She is the wife of Prince Carlos, Duke of Parma, the pretender to the defunct throne of the extinct Duchy of Parma and the Carlist claimant to the Spanish throne. As such, Annemarie is considered Queen Annemarie of Spain by Carlists. She is the Countess of Molina in her own right, having been bestowed with the title by her father-in-law, Carlos Hugo, Duke of Parma, in 2010. Per a 1996 royal decree issued by Queen Beatrix of the Netherlands, upon her marriage she became entitled to the style and title Her Royal Highness Princess Annemarie de Bourbon de Parme in the Netherlands as a member of the extended royal family.

Annemarie worked as a television journalist, specializing in European politics, for the Dutch station NOS Journaal. In 2011, she authored the book De smaak van macht, which focused on the lives of five former Dutch prime ministers. In 2019, Annemarie left journalism and became the first woman to make partner at the consulting firm Ward Howell International.

Early life and family 
Annemarie was born on 18 December 1977 in The Hague to Hans Gualthérie van Weezel and Gerarda Gezina Jolande "Ank" de Visser. She has an elder brother and a younger sister. Her father is a Christian Democratic politician and diplomat who has served in the House of Representatives of the Netherlands, as a member of the European Council. He also served as the Dutch Ambassador to Luxembourg. She is the granddaughter of Jan Gualthérie de Weezel, who was the head of The Hague police and a member of the Dutch Resistance during World War II. Through her great-grandmother, Cecilia Louise Boissevain, she is a descendent of the patrician Boissevain family. Annemarie is also a great-great-great-granddaughter of George Nugent, 1st Marquess of Westmeath.

Education and career 
Annemarie attended Gymnasium Haganum from 1990 to 1992, before transferring to the Lycée international des Pontonniers in Strasbourg, obtaining a French baccalaureate in 1995. She studied corporate communication at James Madison University in the United States from 1995 to 1996 before completing law school at Utrecht University in 2002. She also completed a master's degree in media studies at the University of Groningen in 2003 and studied law at the Sydney Law School and Chinese business law at East China University of Political Science and Law.

After completing her studies, she worked as a parliamentary journalist in The Hague and in Brussels for NOS Journaal. She specialized in European politics and authored a book about five former Prime Ministers of the Netherlands in 2011 titled De smaak van macht. In her book, she interviewed Piet de Jong, Dries van Agt, Ruud Lubbers, Wim Kok, and Jan Peter Balkenende about their time in office.

In June 2019, Annemarie left her job as a journalist and began working as a recruiter for the consulting firm Ward Howell International in Amsterdam in October 2019. She became the first woman partner at Ward Howell International in 2019. She advises companies on diversity and inclusion, as well as female leadership. Annemarie is a member of the Leading Executives Advancing Diversity Network.

Personal life 
On 7 October 2009 the House of Bourbon-Parma announced Annemarie's engagement to Carlos, Prince Hereditary of Parma, the son of Carlos Hugo, Duke of Parma and Princess Irene of the Netherlands. The civil marriage took place on 12 June 2010 in Wijk bij Duurstede. The church wedding was to have taken place in La Cambre Abbey on 28 August 2010, but was postponed due to the illness of the prince's father. In a final announcement about his deteriorating health, the Duke of Parma conferred Carlos as the next Head of the House of Bourbon-Parma and bestowed Annemarie with the title Contessa di Molina (Countess of Molina). The couple married in a Catholic ceremony at La Cambre Abbey on 20 November 2010. The wedding was attended by Máxima, Princess of Orange, Willem-Alexander, Prince of Orange, Queen Beatrix, Prince Jean of Luxembourg, and Duarte Pio, Duke of Braganza. According to a 1996 decree issued by Queen Beatrix, Annemarie and her husband are part of the Dutch nobility and are entitled to the princely Bourbon-Parme title with the style Royal Highness in The Netherlands as members of the extended royal family.

Anne Marie and Carlos have three children:
 Princess Luisa Irene Constance Anna Maria of Bourbon-Parma, Marchioness of Castell'Arquato (Dutch: Prinses Luisa Irene de Bourbon de Parme; born 9 May 2012, The Hague).
 Princess Cecilia Maria Johanna Beatrix of Bourbon-Parma, Countess of Berceto (Dutch: Prinses Cecilia Maria de Bourbon de Parme; born 17 October 2013, The Hague).
 Prince Carlos Enrique Leonard of Bourbon-Parma, Hereditary Prince of Parma and Piacenza, Prince of Piacenza (Dutch: Prins Carlos Enrique de Bourbon de Parme; born 24 April 2016, The Hague).

References

|-

Living people
1977 births
21st-century Dutch journalists
Boissevain family
Duchesses of Parma
Dutch consultants
Dutch people of British descent
Dutch political journalists
Dutch princesses
Dutch Roman Catholics
Dutch women journalists
Annemarie
House of Bourbon-Parma
Italian nobility
Journalists from The Hague
Nobility from The Hague
Princesses by marriage
Princesses of Bourbon-Parma
Spanish countesses
University of Groningen alumni
Utrecht University alumni